The Three Minute Thesis competition or '3MT, is an annual competition held in more than 200 universities worldwide. It is open to PhD students, and challenges participants to present their research in just 180 seconds, in an engaging form that can be understood by an intelligent audience with no background in the research area. This exercise develops presentation, research and academic communication skills and supports the development of research students' capacity to explain their work effectively.

History
The competition originated at the University of Queensland (UQ) in 2008. In 2010 it began to expand to include other Australian universities in a 'trans-Tasman' competition which was further extended in 2016 to be 'Asia-Pacific'. Separate international competitions using the format have also been hosted by other universities, including the Universitas 21 group and Vitae group.

Asia-Pacific competition winners

Participating Counties and Institutions

As of 20 Dec 2019, there were at least 85 participating countries from every continent (apart from Antarctica) and at least 941 institutions.

References

Recurring events established in 2008
2008 establishments in Australia
Australian inventions
Academia
Competitions
Theses